The Albany Senators was a name used by multiple minor league baseball teams representing Albany, New York, that existed between 1885 and 1959. The mid-20th century club played at Hawkins Stadium.

The various editions of the Senators generally played in higher-classification leagues such as the New York State League, the Eastern League that played between 1916 and 1932, the International League, the 1923–37 New York–Pennsylvania League, and the modern Eastern League, in which it played 22 consecutive seasons, 1938–59, before the team disbanded. An early Senators team also played in "outlaw" minor leagues such as the Hudson River League during the 19th century in between stints in "organized baseball."

The club was a powerhouse during the 1940s as a Class A farm team of the Pittsburgh Pirates, posting winning records between 1942–48, making the Eastern League playoffs six times, leading in attendance five times, and taking the 1945 EL championship. Among the Pittsburgh farmhands who played for the club was Hall of Famer Ralph Kiner, in 1941–42.

Over the years, different Senators teams also were affiliated with MLB clubs such as the New York Yankees, Washington Senators, Cincinnati Reds, Boston Red Sox and Kansas City Athletics. The last-place 1959 Senators — the latest in a succession of poor clubs — drew only 45,000 fans for the season and Albany was dropped from the Eastern League when it contracted from eight to six teams for 1960. Professional baseball and the EL would not return to New York's state capital until 1983, when the West Haven A's moved to the area as the Albany-Colonie A's (now the Richmond Flying Squirrels). The current pro baseball team in the Albany area is the Tri-City ValleyCats of the Froniter League.

The International League Senators became the Jersey City Giants in 1937.

Notable alumni
 
Gus Bell
Al Benton
 Como Cotelle
Al Gionfriddo
Pumpsie Green
Stan Hack
Ralph Kiner
George McQuinn
Bill Monbouquette
Johnny Murphy
Bobo Newsom
Albie Pearson
Alabama Pitts
Jake Powell
Red Rolfe
Lloyd Russell
Al Silvera
Mose Solomon, the "Rabbi of Swat"
Frank Sullivan
Billy Werber
Earl Wilson
Taft Wright
John Wyatt

References
Notes

Sources

 Johnson, Lloyd, and Wolff, Miles, eds., The Encyclopedia of Minor League Baseball, 3rd edition. Durham, North Carolina: Baseball America, 2007.

Baseball teams established in 1885
Defunct Eastern League (1938–present) teams
Defunct baseball teams in New York (state)
Defunct International League teams
Baseball teams disestablished in 1959
Sports in Albany, New York
Boston Red Sox minor league affiliates
Cincinnati Reds minor league affiliates
Kansas City Athletics minor league affiliates
New York Yankees minor league affiliates
Pittsburgh Pirates minor league affiliates
1885 establishments in New York (state)
1959 disestablishments in New York (state)
New York State League teams
Hudson River League teams